Al-Ababeed was a Syrian soap opera and historical fiction centered around the 3rd-century Syrian Palmyrene Empire which aired in the Ramadan season of 1997.

In the show, the role of Zenobia of Palmyra is played by famous Syrian actress Raghda. Zenobia's struggle against the Roman Empire is used allegorically to represent the struggles of the Palestinian people to gain self determination.

The series was watched and admired by millions all across the Arab world.

Cast 
The cast was as follows:
Raghda as Queen Zenobia
Abdul Rahman Al Rashi as Emperor Aurelian
Salloum Haddad as Elahbel
Rashid Assaf as Malko
Muna Wassef as Qamra
Assaad Feddah as al-Munzer
May Skaf as Taima
Caresse Bashar as Anagheem
Samar Kokash as Najda
Nizar Sharaby as Cassius Longinus
Bassam Kousa as Amrisha
Abdul Hakim Quotaifan as Zabbai
Hatem Ali as Moqimo
Hani El-Romani as the priest
Adnan Barakat as al-Numan
Sabah Jazairi as Nargese
Ahmed Rafea as Emilius
Yassin Arnaaot as Claudian
Adham El Molla as Muhareb
Laila Jabr as Dala
Mohammed al Rashi as Waeel
Abd el-Rahman Abo el-Qaem as Aylami
Fadwa Mohsen as Mabruka
Hossam Tahsen Beek as the Queen's messenger
Hala Shawkat as Malko's Mother
Saiful Din Subayie as Naheel
Abed Fahed as Ma'ani
Zeyad Saad as Nasr el-Lat
Maher Salibiy as Yamleko

See also
 List of Syrian television series

External links 
Al-Ababeed on IMDb
Al-Ababeed on Elcinema (In Arabic)

References 

1997 Syrian television series debuts
1997 television series endings
1990s Syrian television series
1990s television soap operas
Cultural depictions of Aurelian
Syrian historical television series
Syrian television soap operas
Television series set in the 3rd century
Television series set in the Roman Empire